Ivan Blagov (born 31 January 1986 in Moscow, Russia) is a Russian figure skater who currently competes representing Azerbaijan. He has represented Azerbaijan at the European Figure Skating Championships and the World Figure Skating Championships. His father Vasilii Blagov competed at the World level for the Soviet Union with Irina Tcherniaeva. His mother Elena Frolovna Blagov starred in Moscow on ice for 21 years and is currently a figure skating coach in Moscow.

References
 

1986 births
Living people
Azerbaijani figure skaters
Russian male single skaters
Figure skaters from Moscow